The United States Advisory Commission on Public Diplomacy (ACPD), created in 1948, is tasked by Congress with "appraising U.S. Government activities intended to understand, inform, and influence foreign publics and to increase the understanding of, and support for, these same activities." The commission is supported by the Office of the Under Secretary of State for Public Diplomacy and Public Affairs, and reports to the President, Secretary of State, and Congress. Its current charter authorizes the Commission through fiscal year 2020.

The commission conducts independent research and hosts symposia and panels to discuss public diplomacy while bringing together practitioners throughout the U.S. government and outside experts to provide honest assessments of and policy recommendations for improving U.S. public diplomacy. Priority areas of focus for the commission include: improving research and evaluation to bolster the impact of PD programs; integrating strategic planning with program design; strengthening public diplomacy professionals' development and training; and preparing public diplomats for the changing technological landscape of the 21st century.

Members and leaders
The commission is a non-partisan body and members are appointed by the President and confirmed by the Senate. Current members include Sim Farar, William J. Hybl, and Anne Terman Wedner.  Recent former members include Ambassador Lyndon Lowell Olson, Jr., Ambassador Penne Korth Peacock, and Ambassador Georgette Paulsin Mosbacher, .

The commission's Executive Director oversees general operations and works closely with U.S. government officials, NGOs, think tanks, businesses, academia, and other public diplomacy professionals to produce constructive ideas and recommendations for how the U.S. government engages in public diplomacy. The current executive director of ACPD is Vivian Walker.

Previous executive directors include Shawn Powers, Katherine Brown, Matthew Armstrong, Carl Chan, Athena Katsoulos, Matthew Lauer, and Bruce Gregory.

Reports
The commission publishes reports on a variety of public diplomacy topics, including research and evaluation, using data to measure program impact, digital diplomacy, cultural diplomacy, the diffusion of power, and professional training. The commission's main research product is the "Comprehensive Annual Report on Public Diplomacy and International Broadcasting," which breaks down the U.S. government's expenditures for public diplomacy programs, while also including in-depth analysis of priority U.S. foreign policy issues including countering violent extremism, countering Russian malign influence in Europe and Central Asia, and research and evaluation of public diplomacy and international broadcasting.

The commission recently released its 2019 Comprehensive Annual Report on Public Diplomacy and International Broadcasting, which focuses on funds spent in fiscal year 2018, and provides a complete breakdown of public diplomacy and international broadcasting spending.

The commission also released a special report in 2017, "Can Public Diplomacy Survive The Internet?", which explores how public diplomacy is practiced in a post-truth society. Technological advances have transformed the spread of ideas, which both encourages active public participation in discourse, while also allowing for extremist ideologies to circulate online. This report explores the need for public diplomacy in this new digital age.

References

External links 
Official website

United States national commissions
United States Department of State agencies